Edward Northey may refer to:

 Edward Northey (barrister) (1652–1723), British barrister, Attorney General for England and Wales
 Edward Northey (priest) (1755–1828), Canon of Windsor
 Edward Northey (British Army officer) (1868–1953), British general and Governor of Kenya